Phil Rulloda is an American floral designer, floral design teacher, and author. He has appeared nationally and internationally as a featured speaker and presenter in more than 500 floral industry events. Notable works include Christmas decorating at the White House during the Gerald Ford administration and designing for the 1984 Summer Olympic Games.

Rulloda co-authored and published Contemporary and Tropical Floral Design with Silverio Casabar in 1990, with a second printing released in 1998. He is the owner and head instructor at the Phil Rulloda Southern California School of Floral Design in Anaheim, California.

National and international floral design competitions 
 Grand Champion and First Place Awards in Bridal Bouquet, Table Decor, Designer's Choice and State Category of the FTD America's Cup, 1974
 First Place in Theme Category and Impromptu Design, Interflora Europa/World Cup, 1976
 First Place in Table Decor and State Category, FTD Atlanta Invitational Competition, 1977

Phil owns and teaches the classes at the Southern California School of Floral Design in Anaheim, CA . Rulloda and his family own and operate Avante Garden Florist in Anaheim, CA. In April 2010, the American Institute of Floral Designers (AIFD) Association awarded Rulloda a lifetime membership for his years of service and work for the association.

Phil served as one of the judges for selecting the best Rose Parade Float during Rose Parade 2017.

Awards 
 1987 - First Inductee, Arizona Floriculture Hall of Fame
 1991 - First Recipient, American Institute of Floral Designers Award of Design Influence 
 1200 - Recipient, Floral State Floral Association Place in the Sun Award 
 2003 - Recipient, Tennessee State Floral Association Hall of Fame Award
 2004 - Recipient, Society of American Florists Tommy Bright Award
 2007 - Recipient, American Institute of Floral Designers Award of Distinguished Service to the Floral Industry

References

External links 
 Phil Rulloda School of Floral Design

Year of birth missing (living people)
Living people
American designers
Florists